Astralium tentoriiforme , common name the common tent shell, is a species of sea snail, a marine gastropod mollusk in the family Turbinidae, the turban snails.

Description
The length of the shell varies between 25 mm and 45 mm. The imperforate, solid shell has an elate-conic shape. Its color pattern is pale yellowish. The spire is elevated and contains 7–8 whorls. These are very obliquely finely wrinkled and flat above. The base of the shell is concave. The periphery is acutely carinated, above the carina are obscurely longitudinally folded. The base contains numerous regular concentric squamose lirae. The aperture is very oblique. It is silvery within and angled at the carina. The basal margin is nearly straight, tinged with pink. The short columella is wide and arcuate, sometimes pinkish, terminating in a tubercle below. The parietal callus usually covers more than half the surface of the base. Its margin is often elevated.

The operculum is oval, brown within with sublateral nucleus; outside white, with a curved sub-obsolete central rib and an obsolete short basal rib.

Distribution
This marine species is endemic to Australia and occurs off Queensland to New South Wales.

References

 Jonas, J.H. 1845. Beschreibung neuer Conchylien. Zeitschrift für Malakozoologie 1845: 65–67
 Gould, A.A. 1849. Dr. Gould presented descriptions of the following shells brought home by the U.S. Exploring Expedition. Proceedings of the Boston Society of Natural History 3: 89–92
 Kesteven, H.L. 1902. A Note on two species of Astralium from Port Jackson. Proceedings of the Linnean Society of New South Wales 27(1): 2–6
 Hedley, C. 1923. Studies on Australian Mollusca. Part XIV. Proceedings of the Linnean Society of New South Wales 48: 301–316, pls 30–33 
 Cotton, B.C. 1959. South Australian Mollusca. Archaeogastropoda. Handbook of the Flora and Fauna of South Australia. Adelaide : South Australian Government Printer 449 pp
 McMichael, D.F. 1960. Shells of the Australian Sea-Shore. Brisbane : Jacaranda Press 127 pp., 287 figs.
 Iredale, T. & McMichael, D.F. 1962. A reference list of the marine Mollusca of New South Wales. Memoirs of the Australian Museum 11: 1–109
 Wilson, B. 1993. Australian Marine Shells. Prosobranch Gastropods. Kallaroo, Western Australia : Odyssey Publishing Vol. 1 408 pp.
 Williams, S.T. (2007). Origins and diversification of Indo-West Pacific marine fauna: evolutionary history and biogeography of turban shells (Gastropoda, Turbinidae). Biological Journal of the Linnean Society, 2007, 92, 573–592
 Alf A. & Kreipl K. (2011) The family Turbinidae. Subfamilies Turbininae Rafinesque, 1815 and Prisogasterinae Hickman & McLean, 1990. In: G.T. Poppe & K. Groh (eds), A Conchological Iconography. Hackenheim: Conchbooks. pp. 1–82, pls 104–245

External links
 

tentoriiforme
Gastropods described in 1845